Sergio Brown (born May 22, 1988) is a former American football safety. He was signed by the New England Patriots as an undrafted free agent in 2010. He has also been a member of the Indianapolis Colts, Atlanta Falcons, Jacksonville Jaguars and Buffalo Bills.

Early years
Brown was born in Maywood, Illinois. His father, Mario Brown, was the first African-American men's basketball at Texas A&M. He attended Proviso East High School in Maywood, where he was a two-sport star in football and track. He played wide receiver and defensive back for the Pirates football team. As a senior, he had 710 all-purpose yards and four touchdowns at wide receiver, and 41 tackles, two sacks, and six interceptions as a safety. Academically, he had a 3.2 GPA.

Also a standout track & field athlete, Brown was a state qualifier in the long jump (top-jump of 23 ft, 9 in). He also competed in sprints, recording a personal-best time of 6.68 seconds in the 55-meter dash event at the 2006 Pirate Indoor Classic, where he placed 5th. In addition, he ran a 4.5-second 40-yard dash and had a 31-inch vertical jump.

College career
At the University of Notre Dame, Brown primarily played special teams during his first two seasons, and became a starter in 2008 as a junior, starting 6 of 13 games and recording 28 tackles and one sack. As a senior, he started 12 games, and had 50 tackles and one sack.

Professional career

New England Patriots
After going undrafted in the 2010 NFL Draft, Brown signed with the New England Patriots on April 29, 2010. He was waived during final cuts on September 4, 2010, and re-signed to the team's practice squad the next day. After spending the first six weeks of the season on the practice squad, Brown was promoted to the 53-man roster on October 23. He made his NFL debut the next day against the San Diego Chargers, recording four tackles in the game. In total, Brown played in 11 games for the Patriots in 2010, all as a reserve. He finished the season with 11 tackles.

With the release of Brandon Meriweather and James Sanders during the offseason, Brown became the starting Strong Safety for the season opener. In his first game, he recorded 6 tackles. Brown recorded his first career interception against the Chargers in the second game of the season.

Sergio Brown was waived by the Patriots on August 31, 2012 during final cuts before the beginning of the 2012 NFL season.

Indianapolis Colts
Brown signed with the Indianapolis Colts on September 1, 2012.

Jacksonville Jaguars
Brown signed with the Jacksonville Jaguars on March 11, 2015.

On April 18, 2016, Jacksonville Jaguars released Brown.

Atlanta Falcons
On August 20, 2016, Brown was signed by the Falcons. On August 27, 2016, Brown was waived by the Falcons.

Buffalo Bills
On November 2, 2016, Brown was signed by the Buffalo Bills.

References

External links
New England Patriots bio

1988 births
Living people
Sportspeople from Maywood, Illinois
Players of American football from Illinois
American football safeties
Notre Dame Fighting Irish football players
New England Patriots players
Indianapolis Colts players
Jacksonville Jaguars players
Atlanta Falcons players
Buffalo Bills players